is a Japanese actress and model from Kanagawa Prefecture, Japan.

Career
Watanabe made her film debut in Tatsuya Egawa manga-based movie Tokyo University Story in February 2006 and the next year, in September 2007, she had a brief nude scene in the film Silk.

In September 2009, Shinchosha Publishing released a photobook in "mook" (magazine/book) format {{nihongo|Monthly Naoko Watanabe featuring Watanabe.

Watanabe also appeared in the TBS TV series , based on the Sega game for the PlayStation Portable (PSP), which began airing in May 2010.

She had only a small role in the 2008 parallel worlds thriller Riaru Onigokko (also known as The Chasing Game) but a much larger one as a nurse/woman warrior in the June 2010 sequel Riaru Onigokko 2.

In May 2010, it was announced that Watanabe would have her first starring role in the movie adaptation of AV idol Mihiro's autobiographical work Nude. The movie, directed by Yuichi Onuma, started shooting in May and was released in September 2010. Watanabe met with Mihiro about the role and revealed that she watched some of her videos to study the character — to which Mihiro replied that it was “very embarrassing”. Later that year, Watanabe was one of the regular stars of the Yakuza drama TV series  broadcast October 5 to December 21, 2010 on TBS. She also had a recurring role in the Mainichi Broadcasting System (MBS) suspense drama  which aired January to March 2011.

In May 2014, Watanabe starred as aspiring rock singer Kanna in the Eiji Uchida directed , a comedy horror film about an all-female band and a metal-head zombie. The film also featured real Japanese rock band Gacharic Spin. She also had a supporting role in another Eiji Uchida horror comedy  in November 2014.

Filmography
Sources:
 , February 2006
 , September 2006
 Silk, September 2007
 , February 2008
 , April 2008
 , May 2009
 , June 2010
 , June 2010
 nude, September 2010
 , November 2010
 , October 2011
 , May 2014
 , November 2014
 Lost in Wrestling (2015)

References

External links

1984 births
Living people
Actresses from Kanagawa Prefecture
Models from Kanagawa Prefecture